Suarez Nunatak is a nunatak, 830 m, standing 5 nautical miles (9 km) northwest of Mount Ferrara in the Panzarini Hills portion of the Argentina Range, Pensacola Mountains. Mapped by United States Geological Survey (USGS) from surveys and U.S. Navy air photos, 1956–67. Named by Advisory Committee on Antarctic Names (US-ACAN) for Captain Jorge Suarez, Argentine officer in charge at Ellsworth Station, 1959–61.

Nunataks of Queen Elizabeth Land